The spotted tanager (Ixothraupis punctata) is a species of bird in the tanager family Thraupidae.
It is found in Bolivia, Brazil, Ecuador, French Guiana, Guyana, Peru, Suriname, and Venezuela.
Its natural habitats are subtropical or tropical moist lowland forests and subtropical or tropical moist montane forests.

Taxonomy
In 1760 the French zoologist Mathurin Jacques Brisson included a description of the spotted tanager in his Ornithologie based on a specimen collected in the West Indies. He used the French name Le tangara verd piqueté des Indes  and the Latin name Tangara viridis indica punctulata. Although Brisson coined Latin names, these do not conform to the binomial system and are not recognised by the International Commission on Zoological Nomenclature. When in 1766 the Swedish naturalist Carl Linnaeus updated his Systema Naturae for the twelfth edition he added 240 species that had been previously described by Brisson. One of these was the spotted tanager. Linnaeus included a terse description, coined the binomial name Tanagra punctata and cited Brisson's work. The specific name punctata is Latin for "spotted". The spotted tanager is now placed in the genus Ixothraupis.

Five subspecies are recognised:
 I. p. punctata (Linnaeus, 1766) – south Venezuela, the Guianas and north Brazil
 I. p. zamorae (Chapman, 1925) – central Ecuador and north Peru
 I. p. perenensis (Chapman, 1925) – central Peru
 I. p. annectens (Zimmer, JT, 1943) – southeast Peru
 I. p. punctulata (Sclater, PL & Salvin, 1876) – west-central Bolivia

Gallery

References

spotted tanager
Birds of the Guianas
Birds of the Amazon Basin
Birds of the Yungas
spotted tanager
spotted tanager
Birds of Brazil
Taxonomy articles created by Polbot
Taxobox binomials not recognized by IUCN